There were 12 fencing events at the 2010 South American Games: 6 men's events and 6 women's events. The events were held over March 24–29.

Medal summary

Medal table

Medalists

Fencing
South American Games
2010 South American Games
International fencing competitions hosted by Colombia